Mehjaa' ibn Saleh, sometimes known as Mehjaa', a loyal to Umar ibn al-Khattab (مهجع مولى عمر بن الخطاب) is a Muslim Yemeni soldier participated in the Battle of Badr, and is known  as the first Muslim to be killed in that battle (by an arrow), in contrast to what some believe that Ubaida ibn al-Harith is the first Muslim to be killed.

See also
List of expeditions of Muhammad

References
Mehjaa ibn saleh (Arabic)

624 deaths
People killed at the Battle of Badr
Year of birth missing
Sahabah who participated in the battle of Badr